Hieronymus Bosch is a New Zealand-based dark industrial experimental noise punk act formed around 1985–86.

History
The band originally used reel-to-reel tape recorders, loop effects, steel objects and a range of classic analog synths and drum machines. They performed only three times as this incarnation, twice in New Zealand and once in Sydney, Australia. The live art performances included poetry and slide shows and were performed in art galleries. Their sound has varied significantly over time, due to collaborating with many different engineers, percussionists, guitarists, and artists.

At a performance in early 1986, the entire interior of a condemned house was torn apart, accompanied by looping noise tapes fed through a generator driven PA system. Around 30 people took part in the destruction of the property.

The mid-1980s saw the band become a three-piece, fusing darkwave and industrial. This line-up only lasted a few months, playing one very loose live set accompanying a gothic/dark art fashion show at an inner-city nightclub.

In 1990, guitarist Morpheus Ire joined the band from a local dark metal band and Paul Blanchard joined as a bassist/percussionist. They performed often throughout 1990–1993, before returning to their earlier, more industrial sound in the mid-1990s, and returning to a two piece of the original members in 1996.

Releases
Their first recordings were zero-budget, on limited tape cassette format, and duplicated on a double stereo cassette deck. In 1990, they moved to video format, with a five-track release entitled "Hieronymus Bosch - The Video", limited to 300 copies. In 1997 the band released a self-titled album, followed in 1998 by their second album, The Divided Self. They have also had tracks included on international underground compilations and appeared on the mid 1990s performance/video release series Technohell.

Hieronymus Bosch have produced short film soundtracks for video artists in Belgium and Australia. In 2003 they released their third album, The Dream Songs, on Polish label, Fluttering Dragon. In 2010, they released a limited edition 7-inch vinyl, "Black Light / Black Star" to mark their 25th anniversary.

Discography

Albums 
 Hieronymus Bosch - Abducted cassette (1986)
 Hieronymus Bosch vs Leper Asylum - Split Cassette release (1990)
 Hieronymus Bosch - The videos. VHS (1990)
 Hieronymus Bosch - Faded. 3 track CD-R - Limited to 25 copies (1994)
 Hieronymus Bosch - Self Titled (1997)
 The Divided Self (1998)
 The Dream Songs (2003)
 Black Light/ Black Star 7" vinyl - limited edition of 150 (2010)

References 

New Zealand industrial music groups
Power electronics (music)